Microcharmus is a genus of scorpions in the family Buthidae. The species are endemic to Madagascar.

List of species
The following species are recognised in the genus Microcharmus:
 Microcharmus andrei  Lourenço, Waeber & Wilme, 2019
 Microcharmus antongil Lourenço, Waeber & Wilme, 2019
 Microcharmus bemaraha Lourenço, Goodman & Fisher, 2006
 Microcharmus cloudsleythompsoni Lourenço, 1995
 Microcharmus confluenciatus Lourenço, Goodman & Fisher, 2006
 Microcharmus djangoa Lourenço, Waeber & Wilme, 2019
 Microcharmus duhemi Lourenço, Goodman & Fisher, 2006
 Microcharmus fisheri Lourenço, 1998
 Microcharmus hauseri Lourenço, 1996
 Microcharmus jussarae Lourenço, 1996
 Microcharmus maculatus Lourenço, Goodman & Fisher, 2006
 Microcharmus madagascariensis Lourenço, 1999
 Microcharmus pauliani (Lourenço, 2004)
 Microcharmus sabineae Lourenço, 1996
 Microcharmus variegatus Lourenço, Goodman & Fisher, 2006
 Microcharmus violaceous Lourenço, Goodman & Fisher, 2006

References

Buthidae
Scorpion genera

Taxa named by Wilson R. Lourenço